Wearable art, also known as Artwear or "art to wear", refers to art pieces in the shape of clothing or jewellery pieces. These pieces are usually handmade, and are produced only once or as a very limited series. Pieces of clothing are often made with fibrous materials and traditional techniques such as crochet, knitting, quilting, but may also include plastic sheeting, metals, paper, and more. While the making of any article of clothing or other wearable object typically involves aesthetic considerations, the term wearable art implies that the work is intended to be accepted as an artistic creation or statement. Wearable art is meant to draw attention while it is being displayed, modeled or used in performances. Pieces may be sold and exhibited.

Wearable art sits at the crossroads of craft, fashion and art. The modern idea of wearable art seems to have surfaced more than once in various forms. Jewellery historians identify a wearable art movement spanning roughly the years 1930 to 1960. Textile and costume historians identify wearable art as a heir to the 1850s Arts and Crafts movement, which burgeoned in the 1960s.

It grew in importance in the 1970s, fueled by hippie and mod subcultures, and alongside craftivism, fiber arts and feminist art. Artists identifying with this movement are overwhelmingly women. In the late 1990s, wearable art becomes difficult to distinguish from fashion, and in the 2000s-2010s begins integrating new materials such as electronics.

History

Origins 
The wearable art movements inherits from the Arts and Crafts movements, which sought to integrate art in everyday life and objects. Carefully handmade clothing was considered as a device for self-articulation and furthermore, a strategy to defy large-scale manufacturing. The optimistic start of the movement that considered pieces of clothing to be a type of self-articulation today has developed into a new and fresh style of garments.

In the United States 
The term wearable art itself emerged around 1975 to distinguish it from body art, and was used alongside Artwear and "Art to Wear," coined by Julie Schafler Dale. In the United States, the wearable art movement emerges from the renewal of crafts education, notably at Cranbrook Academy of Art and the Pratt Institute, who introduced teaching on weaving. It was supported by the American Craft Council and the museums of Crafts and Design. The best known galleries were Obiko in San Francisco, and Julie: Artisans' Gallery in New York.

Outside the United States 
Crafts and art education being more separated outside of the United States, it is harder to identify wearable art as a separate movement. However, renewed interest in traditional textile crafts such as shibori dying sparked the interest of artist worldwide.

Contemporary Wearable Art 
Wearable art declines as a separate movement in the late 1990s due to competition from industry, which enabled customization at scale, the migration of artists towards haute couture or the production of small series, and the broader availability of handcrafted garments from around the world in the Global North. An example is the 2015 Fall couture show Viktor and Rolf, which explored how the shapes of traditional artworks such as frames could become garments.

Mediums and Shapes
Artists creating wearable fiber art may use purchased finished fabrics or other materials, making them into unique garments, or may dye and paint virgin fabric. Countering the belief that art is something expensive, some clothing artists have started local companies to produce quality art work and clothing for a modest price.

Mediums

Fibers 
Crochet, embroidery, knitting, lace, quilting and felting are all commonly found in wearable art pieces.

Jewelry 

Some 20th-century modern artists and architects sought to elevate bodily ornamentation — that is, jewellery — to the level of fine art and original design, rather than mere decoration, craft production of traditional designs, or conventional settings for showing off expensive stones or precious metals. Jewelry was used by surrealists, cubists, abstract expressionists, and other modernist artists working in the middle decades of the 20th century.

Electronics 
As wearable computing technology develops, increasingly miniaturized and stylized equipment is starting to blend with wearable art esthetics.  Low-power mobile computing allows light-emitting and color-changing flexible materials  and high-tech fabrics to be used in complex and subtle ways.  Some practitioners of the Steampunk movement have produced elaborate costumes and accessories which incorporate a pseudo-Victorian style with modern technology and materials.

Shapes 
A recurring shape in the Art to Wear movement was the kimono. It enables to rapidly turn a piece of custom fabric into a garment.

Relationship to Fine Arts, Fiber Arts and Performance 
Performance and conceptual artists have sometimes produced examples which are more provocative than useful.  Trashion is another branch of extraordinary wearable art, for example, work by Marina DeBris.  The Portland Oregon Trashion Collective, Junk to Funk, has been using creating outrageous art garments out of trash.

A well-known example is the Electric Dress, a ceremonial wedding kimono-like costume consisting mostly of variously colored electrified and painted light bulbs, enmeshed in a tangle of wires, created in 1956 by the Japanese Gutai artist Atsuko Tanaka. This extreme garment was something like a stage costume. Not really wearable in an everyday, practical  sense, it functioned rather as part of a daring work of performance art (though the "performance" element consisted merely of the artist's wearing the piece while mingling with spectators in a gallery setting).

In Nam June Paik's 1969 performance piece called TV Bra for Living Sculpture, Charlotte Moorman played a cello while wearing a brassiere made of two small operating television sets.

Canadian artist Andrea Vander Kooij created a group of pieces called Garments for Forced Intimacy (2006). According to an essay at Concordia University's Faculty of Fine Arts gallery website, these hand-knit articles of clothing are designed to be worn by two people simultaneously, and they, "as the name states, compel the wearers into uncharacteristic proximity."

In Belgium, Racso Jugarap, a wire artist creates wearable pieces using the material that he uses for his sculptures. playing with the malleability of metal wires.
Some artists, like Isamaya Ffrench and Damselfrau, create experimental masks as wearable art, using materials from Lego bricks (Ffrench); plastic trinkets, antique hear wreaths and old laces (Damselfrau).

During the 1970s to 1980s, Janet Lipkin became an influential crochet artist within the ArtWear Movement. Lipkin's designs draw inspirations from organic forms and employ bold colors throughout her pieces.

Major exhibitions, events and organizations

Exhibitions 

 The Museum of Arts and Design has hosted exhibitions related to Wearable art since 1965
 Art for Wearing, San Francisco Museum of Modern Art
 Art to Wear, 1987, Museum of Contemporary Art Cleveland
 Artwear: Fashion and Anti-fashion, De Young Memorial Museum in San Francisco
 Off the Wall: American Art to Wear, 2019-2020, Philadephia Museum of Art

Events 

 World of Wearabe Art Awards, held annually since 1987 and run by Suzie Moncrieff.

Organizations 

 Fiberworks Art Center for Textile Arts, founded in 1973, closed 1987 in Berkeley
 World Shibori Network
 World Textile Art

See also
 Fashion accessories
 Steampunk
 Wearable computing

References

External links
World of WearableArt Awards Show - a renowned international design competition and spectacular, theatrical production held annually in Wellington, New Zealand.
The Wearable Art Awards - Wearable Art competition held yearly in Port Moody, Canada
Museum of Northwest Art Wearable Art Workshop by Paul Kuniholm
Wearable Art competition held annually in Alice Springs as part of the Alice Desert Festival
The Wearable Art italian artist Andrea Valentino Piccinini - The Wearable Art Italian artist Andrea Valentino Piccinini, Modena Italy.

 
Visual arts genres
Textile arts
Trashion
Fashion accessories